Maras or Mares in Iran, also known as Marest, may refer to:
 Maras-e Bozorg
 Maras-e Kuckak